This is a comprehensive list of Newman Societies around the world

Australia 
University of Queensland and Charles Sturt University both house Newman Centres.

Canada 
See Canadian Newman Centres

United Kingdom 
Oxford University Newman Society

United States 
http://www.newmanconnection.com/locations/find

Newman Societies